Stanley Roman (born 4 June 1941) is an Indian prelate of the Catholic Church. He was Bishop of Quilon, India, from 2001 to 2018. He also chaired the education committee of the Kerala Catholic Bishops' Council.

Biography
Stanley Roman was born on 4 June 1941 at Punalur in Kollam district.  He is the 10th of the eleven children of Roman Fernandez and Elizabeth (7 boys and 4 girls).

After Roman's primary education at St. John's L.P. School and Government U.P. School, Akkara at Punalur, he joined St. Raphael's Minor Seminary at Kollam, where he was later to be vice rector, for religious studies and simultaneously completed his schooling from St. Aloysius School, Kollam.

In 1959, Roman commenced philosophy studies at St. Joseph's Pontifical Seminary, Aluva. After 2 years, he was chosen to pursue priestly studies at the Pontifical Urban University, Rome, where he received a master's degree in Philosophy and Theology. He was ordained priest by Cardinal Agagiani, the Prefect of the Congregation for the Evangelization of Peoples at St. Peter's Basilica, Rome on 16 December 1966.

When Roman returned to Kollam, he was initially appointed as the prefect of St. Raphael's Seminary. Along with his ministry he took his time to learn the Indian musical instrument "Veena", despite of his deep knowledge in Western Music. He continued his studies and received a Master of Arts in English language and literature from the University of Kerala.  He then joined Fatima Mata National College, Kollam as an English instructor and the bursar, and later became its principal. After holding various posts in the diocese, he was appointed the first rector of Carmel Giri Major Seminary, Latin rite, when St. Joseph's Pontifical Seminary was re-organized on the basis of rites.

Roman was appointed as the 13th Bishop of Quilon on 29 October 2001, while he was serving as the rector of Carmelgiri Seminary. Roman was ordained on 16 December 2001.  In 2004, Roman founded the Pradhibhodayam education program, for scholastically gifted, but financially challenged members of the diocese.  In 2007, Roman inaugurated Jagat Jyoti Mandir (House of the Light of the Universe), which is a Christian church incorporating Hindu cultural elements.

Pope Francis accepted his resignation on 18 April 2018.

References

External links

 Roman Catholic Diocese of Quilon, website
http://www.madhyamam.com/news/99312/110715

21st-century Roman Catholic bishops in India
Living people
People from Kollam district
University of Kerala alumni
Pontifical Urban University alumni
1941 births
Christian clergy from Kerala